Howard Longstreth Clark Sr. (1916 – February 2, 2001) was chief executive officer of American Express from 1960 to 1977. Howard L. Clark Jr. is his son.

References

1916 births
2001 deaths
American chief executives of financial services companies
American Express people
People from South Pasadena, California
Harvard Law School alumni
Stanford University alumni
Columbia Business School alumni
United States Navy personnel of World War II
United States Navy officers
Military personnel from California